St. Joseph's Hospital is a historic building and a former church hospital, located at 355 Buena Vista Avenue East in San Francisco, California. It was built in 1928 by architects Bakewell and Brown in a Spanish Renaissance Revival style. It was added to the National Register of Historic Places on May 9, 1985.

History 
St. Joseph's Hospital was founded at this location in 1889, and was built by a charitable donation to the Catholic church. The Franciscan Sisters provided medical care and administration and some of the patients were given care on a charity basis.

The hospital was delicensed on September 6, 1979, and was converted to condominium apartments.

See also 

 National Register of Historic Places listings in San Francisco

References

Hospital buildings completed in 1928
Hospitals in San Francisco
Hospital buildings on the National Register of Historic Places in California
National Register of Historic Places in San Francisco
1928 establishments in California